"The Longest Night" is an episode of the BBC sitcom Only Fools and Horses. It was the third episode of series 5, and was first screened on 14 September 1986. In the episode the Trotters are accused of shoplifting at a local supermarket and taken up to the manager's office. Whilst there they are held hostage by an armed robber who shares a connection with Del.

Synopsis
During their weekly shopping trip at their local supermarket, Del Boy, Rodney, and Albert are summoned by head security officer Tom Clark to the manager Mr. Peterson's office. They initially assume they have won an advertised £1,000 cash prize for being the store's millionth customers, but instead are accused of shoplifting. At the same time, a young man enters the supermarket and shoplifts several items. Clark catches him in the act and takes him up to the manager's office. In the office, the man brandishes a handgun at everyone in the room, including the Trotters, and demands that the manager opens the safe. However, the manager informs him that the safe is fitted with a time lock and will not unlock until the following morning. Instead of following Albert's suggestion of returning the next morning, the thief locks the office door, forcing everyone to stay in the office overnight.

Throughout the night, the Trotters try to keep themselves from boredom, such as Albert doing exercise. The thief brags to the Trotters that the police have nicknamed him "The Shadow" because he is a fast and quiet mover in a manner very similar to that of The Scarlet Pimpernel.

The next morning, with only half an hour to go until the safe's time lock expires, Del, Albert, Mr. Peterson and Mr. Clark awake to find Rodney tip-toeing over to reach and grab the sleeping Shadow's gun. But instead of the gun, Rodney picks up a packet of cigarettes. Shadow wakes up, and recognises Del as the man who used to sell him and his mother shoes when he was a boy. Shadow re-introduces himself as Lennox Gilbey, and the two get acquainted again. Lennox reveals that he is not really a wanted criminal and is doing this to beat poverty, as nobody will give him a job. Del attempts to persuade Lennox to give the theft up, but Lennox then reveals that Mr. Peterson and Mr. Clark are in on the act as well: Peterson has a shopaholic wife, and the pension Clark will receive from his impending retirement is far too small to live on. In order to solve their respective problems, the three planned to stage a robbery and share the £60,000 in the safe, but needed independent witnesses, so they brought the Trotters into the office after falsely accusing them of shoplifting. Instead of going to the police, Del strikes a deal with them: they will hire Lennox as a security guard with a view to becoming head security officer when Mr. Clark retires, and when the Trotters return to the supermarket later that day (as most of the food from their original trip has gone stale), the family will be named the supermarket's millionth customers and awarded the £1,000 prize. Mr. Peterson agrees with the proposal, and Del shakes hands with him to seal the deal.

Episode cast

Episode concept
The idea for the script was based on a true story that John Sullivan had read about a small-time criminal who went into a supermarket and pulled off a scam with the security manager and the store manager.

References

External links

1986 British television episodes
Only Fools and Horses (series 5) episodes